Criticism of copyright, or anti-copyright sentiment, is a dissenting view of the current state of copyright law or copyright as a concept. Critics often discuss philosophical, economical, or social rationales of such laws and the laws' implementations, the benefits of which they claim do not justify the policy's costs to society. They advocate for changing the current system, though different groups have different ideas of what that change should be. Some call for remission of the policies to a previous state—copyright once covered few categories of things and had shorter term limits—or they may seek to expand concepts like fair use that allow permissionless copying. Others seek the abolition of copyright itself.

Opposition to copyright is often a portion of platforms advocating for broader social reform. For example, Lawrence Lessig, a free-culture movement speaker, advocates for loosening copyright law as a means of making sharing information easier or addressing the orphan works issue and the Swedish Pirate Party has advocated for limiting copyright to five year terms.

Economic arguments against copyright

Non-scarcity

There is an argument that copyright is invalid because, unlike physical property, intellectual property is not scarce and is a legal fiction created by the state. The argument claims that, infringing on copyright, unlike theft, does not deprive the victim of the original item.

Historical comparison
It is unclear that copyright laws are economically stimulating for most authors, and it is uncommon for copyright laws to be evaluated based on empirical studies of their impacts.

Information technology related concerns

One of the founders of Piratbyrån, Rasmus Fleischer, argues that copyright law simply seems unable to cope with the Internet, and hence is obsolete. He argues that the Internet, and particularly Web 2.0 have brought about the uncertain status of the very idea of "stealing" itself, and that instead business models need to adapt to the reality of the Darknet. He argues that in an attempt to rein in Web 2.0, copyright law in the 21st century is increasingly concerned with criminalising entire technologies, leading to recent attacks on different kinds of search engines, solely because they provide links to files which may be copyrighted. Fleischer points out that Google, while still largely uncontested, operates in a gray zone of copyright (e.g. the business model of Google Books is to display millions of pages of copyrighted and uncopyrighted books as part of a business plan drawing its revenue from advertising). In contrast, others have pointed out that Google Books blocks out large sections of those same books, and they say that does not harm the legitimate interests of rightsholders.

Cultural arguments

Freedom of knowledge

Groups such as Hipatia advance anti-copyright arguments in the name of "freedom of knowledge" and argue that knowledge should be "shared in solidarity". Such groups may perceive "freedom of knowledge" as a right, and/or as fundamental in realising the right to education, which is an internationally recognised human right, as well as the right to a free culture and the right to free communication. They argue that current copyright law hinders the realisation of these rights in today's knowledge societies relying on new technological means of communication and see copyright law as preventing or slowing human progress.

Authorship and creativity
Lawrence Liang, founder of the Alternative Law Forum, argues that current copyright is based on a too narrow definition of "author", which is assumed to be clear and undisputed. Liang observes that the concept of "the author" is assumed to make universal sense across cultures and across time. Instead, Liang argues that the notion of the author as a unique and transcendent being, possessing originality of spirit, was constructed in Europe after the Industrial Revolution, to distinguish the personality of the author from the expanding realm of mass-produced goods. Hence works created by "authors" were deemed original, and merges with the doctrine of property prevalent at the time.

Liang argues that the concept of "author" is tied to the notion of copyright and emerged to define a new social relationship—the way society perceives the ownership of knowledge. The concept of "author" thus naturalised a particular process of knowledge production where the emphasis on individual contribution and individual ownership takes precedence over the concept of "community knowledge". Relying on the concept of the author, copyright is based on the assumption that without an intellectual property rights regime, authors would have no incentive to further create, and that artists cannot produce new works without an economic incentive. Liang challenges this logic, arguing that "many authors who have little hope of ever finding a market for their publications, and whose copyright is, as a result, virtually worthless, have in the past, and even in the present, continued to write." Liang points out that people produce works purely for personal satisfaction, or even for respect and recognition from peers. Liang argues that the 19th Century saw the prolific authorship of literary works in the absence of meaningful copyright that benefited the author. In fact, Liang argues, copyright protection usually benefited the publisher, and rarely the author.

Preservation of cultural works
The Center for the Study of Public Domain has raised concerns on how the protracted copyright terms in the United States have caused historical films and other cultural works to be destroyed due to disintegration before they can be digitized.  The center has described the copyright terms as "absurdly long" which hold little economic benefit to rights holders and prevents efforts to preserve historical artefacts. Director Jennifer Jenkins has said that by the time artefacts enter the public domain in the United States after 95 years, many culturally significant works such as old films and sound recordings have already been lost as a consequence of the long copyright terms.

Ethical issues
The institution of copyright brings up several ethical issues. Selmer Bringsjord argues that all forms of copying are morally permissible (without commercial use), because some forms of copying are permissible and there is not a logical distinction between various forms of copying.

Edwin Hettinger argues that natural rights arguments for intellectual property are weak and the philosophical tradition justifying property can not guide us in thinking about intellectual property.

Shelly Warwick believes that copyright law as currently constituted does not appear to have a consistent ethical basis.

As of 2022 and 2023, many have had concerns about AI-generated images ("AI art"). This has led to many ethical concerns of whether or not the use of copyrighted material for training is considered fair use, and whether or not the output of AI models is copyrighted.

Organisations and scholars

Groups advocating the abolition of copyright

Pirate Cinema and groups like The League of Noble Peers advance more radical arguments, opposing copyright per se. A number of anti-copyright groups have recently emerged in the argument over peer-to-peer file sharing, digital freedom, and freedom of information; these include the Association des Audionautes and the Kopimism Church of New Zealand.

In 2003, Eben Moglen, a professor of Law at Columbia University, published The dotCommunist Manifesto, which re-interpreted the Communist Manifesto by Karl Marx in the light of the development of computer technology and the internet; much of the re-interpreted content discussed copyright law and privilege in Marxist terms.

Recent developments related to BitTorrent and peer-to-peer file sharing have been termed by media commentators as "copyright wars", with The Pirate Bay being referred to as "the most visible member of a burgeoning international anti-copyright—or pro-piracy—movement". One well-publicised instance of electronic civil disobedience (ECD) in the form of large scale intentional copyright infringement occurred on February 24, 2004, in an event called Grey Tuesday. Activists intentionally violated EMI's copyright of The White Album by distributing MP3 files of a mashup album called The Grey Album, in an attempt to draw public attention to copyright reform issues and anti-copyright ideals. Reportedly over 400 sites participated including 170 that hosted the album with some protesters stating that The Grey Album illustrates a need for revisions in copyright law to allow sampling under fair use of copyrighted material, or proposing a system of fair compensation to allow for sampling.

Groups advocating changes to copyright law
French group Association des Audionautes is not anti-copyright per se, but proposes a reformed system for copyright enforcement and compensation. Aziz Ridouan, co-founder of the group, proposes for France to legalise peer-to-peer file sharing and to compensate artists through a surcharge on Internet service provider fees (i.e. an alternative compensation system). Wired magazine reported that major music companies have equated Ridouan's proposal with legitimising piracy. In January 2008, seven Swedish members of parliament from the Moderate Party (part of the governing coalition), authored a piece in a Swedish tabloid calling for the complete decriminalisation of file sharing; they wrote that "Decriminalising all non-commercial file sharing and forcing the market to adapt is not just the best solution. It's the only solution, unless we want an ever more extensive control of what citizens do on the Internet."

In June 2015 a WIPO article, "Remix culture and Amateur Creativity: A Copyright Dilemma", acknowledged the "age of remixing" and the need for a copyright reform while referring to recent law interpretations in Lenz v. Universal Music Corp. and Canada's Copyright Modernization Act.

Groups advocating using existing copyright law

Groups that argue for using existing copyright legal framework with special licences to achieve their goals, include the copyleft movement and Creative Commons. Creative Commons is not anti-copyright per se, but argues for use of more flexible and open copyright licences within existing copyright law. Creative Commons takes the position that there is an unmet demand for flexibility that allows the copyright owner to release work with only "some rights reserved" or even "no rights reserved". According to Creative Commons many people do not regard default copyright as helping them in gaining the exposure and widespread distribution they want. Creative Commons argue that their licences allow entrepreneurs and artists to employ innovative business models rather than all-out copyright to secure a return on their creative investment.

Scholars and commentators

Scholars and commentators in this field include Lawrence Liang, Jorge Cortell, Rasmus Fleischer, Stephan Kinsella, and Siva Vaidhyanathan.

Traditional anarchists, such as Leo Tolstoy, expressed their refusal to accept copyright.

See also

 Anti-copyright notice
 Copyright abolition
 Culture vs. Copyright
 Criticism of intellectual property
 Criticism of patents
 Creative Commons
 Copyfraud
 Copyleft
 Copyright alternatives
 Fair dealing
 Free culture movement
 Freedom of information
 Freedom of speech
 Good Copy Bad Copy
 Home Recording Rights Coalition
 Information management
 Information wants to be free
 Internet freedom
 Missionary Church of Kopimism
 New Zealand Internet Blackout
 Operation Payback
 Philosophy of copyright
 Pirate Party
 Public domain
 Sci-Hub
 Steal This Film
 Sony Corp. of America v. Universal City Studios, Inc.
 Warez

References

External links

 Abandoning Copyright: A Blessing for Artists, Art, and Society – Opinion by Professor Joost Smiers
 Anti-Copyright Resources
 Gnomunism – Utopia of Anti-copyright applied to all types of data that can be copied
 The Surprising History of Copyright and The Promise of a Post-Copyright World by Karl Fogel of QuestionCopyright.org.
 Unlicense.org – The Unlicense is a template for disclaiming copyright interest in software.
 Culture vs. Copyright – ebook by Anatoly Volynets. The book is composed of dialogues of first graders and their teacher contemplations on cultural, psychological, economical and other aspects of "Intellectual Property".

Criticism of intellectual property
 
Copyright
Copyright
Copyright law
Articles containing video clips